Wafaei Fawzi is a Sudanese-American epidemiomologist currently the Richard Saltonstall Professor of Population Sciences at Harvard T.H. Chan School of Public Health.  He is also Professor of Nutrition, Epidemiology, and Global Health and the Chair of the Department of Global Health and Population.

Education
MBBS, 1986, Faculty of Medicine, University of Khartoum
MPH (Public Health), 1989, Harvard School of Public Health
MS (Maternal and Child Health), 1991, Harvard School of Public Health
DrPH (Epidemiology and Nutrition), 1992, Harvard School of Public Health

References

Year of birth missing (living people)
Living people
Harvard School of Public Health faculty
American epidemiologists
Harvard School of Public Health alumni
University of Khartoum alumni